Joseph Adrian Worrall (born 10 January 1997) is an English professional footballer who captains and plays as a centre-back for  club Nottingham Forest. He has also represented England at youth level, and captained the England squad that won the 2017 Toulon Tournament.

Early life and career
Joseph Adrian Worrall was born on 10 January 1997 in Nottingham, Nottinghamshire. He started playing football for Kimberley Miners' Welfare at the age of eight, before playing for Priory Celtic when moving to Watnall and Hucknall Sports when moving to Hucknall.

Club career
Worrall signed with Nottingham Forest in October 2011, rejecting interest from other local sides, Derby County and Leicester City. Worrall joined League Two club Dagenham & Redbridge on 8 January 2016 on a one-month loan deal. He made his professional debut the next day in a third-round FA Cup tie against Everton, which Dagenham & Redbridge lost 2–0, and scored his first professional goal on 23 January in a 2–2 draw away to Newport County. Worrall made his first-team debut for Forest on 29 October 2016 at Reading and, despite losing the game 2–0, his performance was praised as "strong" and "decisive" by the Nottingham Post. He revealed that he had been frustrated with the quality of Forest's defending that season and pulled manager Philippe Montanier aside to ask for a chance in the first team. Montanier simply replied "OK, you play against Reading on Saturday".

On 19 November, Worrall started alongside Damien Perquis and Matt Mills in a three-man defence as Forest earned their first away win and clean sheet of the season at Ipswich Town. His performance led to Worrall being included in the Football League's Team of the Week and comparisons to former Forest and England defender Michael Dawson. He also received praise from manager Philippe Montanier, who described the centre-back as "strong and tall, but very clever too, tactically". Worrall's performances were noticed by Premier League clubs, with Everton and Stoke City reportedly tracking the centre-back. On 27 February 2017, Worrall signed a three-and-a-half-year contract to extend his stay with Nottingham Forest until 2020. Then later that year, after his success with England at the Toulon Tournament, he signed a further extension until 2022.

On 31 August 2018, Worrall joined Scottish Premiership club Rangers on loan until the end of the 2018–19 season. Worrall did not wish to go out on loan, and turned down a move to Ipswich Town, but Forest manager Aitor Karanka insisted that he needed more experience.

Following his loan spell at Rangers, Worrall became a key player in the Nottingham Forest side under new manager Sabri Lamouchi, with the defender starting every league game of the 2019–20 season. He signed a four-year contract extension in February 2020.

During the 2021-22 season, Worrall regularly captained the Forest side during Lewis Grabban's absence through injury. He scored against rivals Leicester City during a 4-1 FA Cup win. He played a key role in Forest's promotion to the Premier League and captained them in their 1–0 Play-off final victory over Huddersfield Town at Wembley. Worrall was also featured in that season's EFL Championship Team of the Season alongside teammates Ryan Yates and Djed Spence.

On 4 August 2022, Worrall was named Forest's captain for their season in the 2022–23 Premier League.

International career
On 19 May 2017, Worrall was called up to the England representative squad for the 2017 Toulon Tournament as a replacement for Charlton Athletic's Ezri Konsa, who had been promoted to the U20 squad for the 2017 FIFA U-20 World Cup. Appointed as the team's captain, Worrall played four times and lifted the trophy as England defended their title on penalties after a 1–1 draw with the Ivory Coast in the final. Worrall was named the second-best player of the tournament after teammate David Brooks, who won the award.

Following his impressive summer with England, Worrall received his first call-up to the U21 squad on 24 August 2017 for their upcoming qualifying matches against their Dutch and Latvian counterparts. Worrall was, however, left out of the squad against the Dutch and was an unused substitute in his team's 3–0 win over Latvia on 5 September.

Career statistics

Honours
Nottingham Forest
EFL Championship play-offs: 2022

England U20
Toulon Tournament: 2017

Individual
Toulon Tournament Best XI: 2017
Toulon Tournament Silver Ball: 2017
Nottingham Forest Player of the Season: 2020–21
EFL Championship Team of the Season: 2021–22

References

External links

Profile at the Nottingham Forest F.C. website

1997 births
Living people
People from Hucknall
Footballers from Nottinghamshire
Footballers from Nottingham
English footballers
Association football defenders
Nottingham Forest F.C. players
Dagenham & Redbridge F.C. players
Rangers F.C. players
English Football League players
Scottish Professional Football League players
Premier League players
England youth international footballers
England under-21 international footballers